Kathleen Blake (born December 18, 1946) is an American former professional tennis player.

Blake, a California native, won the USTA Under-16s national hardcourt championships in 1962.

Before the introduction of tiebreaks, she held the record for playing the longest match in women's professional tennis, with a 12-10, 6-8, 14-12 win over Elena Subirats at Piping Rock in 1966.

Blake's best national ranking was 11th.

Her best performances in grand slams came in doubles, including a mixed doubles quarter-final appearance at the 1965 Wimbledon Championships. She was a women's doubles quarter-finalist at the 1964 U.S. National Championships and in the same tournament two years later made the mixed doubles semi-finals with Butch Seewagen.

Married to tennis coach Wayne Bryan since 1973, Blake is the mother of identical twin doubles players the Bryan brothers (Bob and Mike).

References

External links
 

1946 births
Living people
American female tennis players
Tennis people from California
21st-century American women